Tyrolerfjord is a fjord in King Christian X Land, East Greenland. Administratively it is part of the Northeast Greenland National Park zone.

History
During the 1869–70 Second German North Polar Expedition of Carl Koldewey this body of water was surveyed by Julius Payer, who was impressed by the beauty of the Alpine-type mountain ranges surrounding the fjord and named it after the Tyrol historical region in the Alps.

Since the fjord forms a geographic whole with Young Sound, which had previously been named by William Scoresby, Koldewey used the name "Tyrolerfjord" —or "Tiroler Fjord" in the reports by Julius Payer— for the whole water body, all the way to its mouth in Gael Hamke Bay. Later, during the 1929–1930 Expedition to East Greenland, Lauge Koch reinstated the name "Young Sund" for the outer section of the water body.

There are a number of Norwegian and Danish hunting cabins in the shores of the fjord.

Geography
Tyrolerfjord is a fjord that stretches deep inland west of Young Sound and north of Clavering Island, forming the northern shore of the island. To the north lies A. P. Olsen Land. The Pasterze Glacier has its terminus on the western side of its northern end with a river draining it and flowing into the fjord. Further north flows the Gerda Glacier and Payer Land lies to the southwest of the whole area.

After the junction it branches roughly southwards for about  until the northern end of a shallow area named Revet.

See also
List of fjords of Greenland

References

External links
 Towards quantifying the glacial runoff signal in the freshwater input to Tyrolerfjord–Young Sound, NE Greenland
 Circulation and fjord-shelf exchange during the ice-covered period in Young Sound-Tyrolerfjord, Northeast Greenland (74°N)
 „4 Mann im Zelt à la Sardine.“ Eine Expedition des Schweizer Geologen Adolf Ernst Mittelholzer im März und April 1939 in Nordost-Grönland (in German)

Fjords of Greenland